Kevin Kelly (born August 18, 1953) is an American politician from Maryland and a member of the Democratic Party. He served in the Maryland House of Delegates, representing District 1B in Allegany County for six terms, from 1987 until 1995, and again from 1999 until 2015. Kelly was a member of the Judiciary Committee and its Civil Law and Procedure Subcommittee.

Background
Kelly was born in Cumberland, Maryland on August 18, 1953. He graduated from Bishop Walsh School in 1971.  After high school he attended Frostburg State University where he got his B.S. in Political Science.  After Frostburg he attended the University of Baltimore School of Law where he attained his J.D. in 1978. Kelly was admitted to the Maryland bar in 1980.

Education
Kevin Kelly received his education from the following institutions:
JD, University of Baltimore School of Law, 1978
BS, Political Science, Frostburg State College, 1975

Political experience
Kevin Kelly has had the following political experience:
Delegate, Maryland State House of Delegates, 1999-2015
Delegate, Maryland State House of Delegates, 1987-1995

Current legislative committees
Kevin Kelly has been a member of the following committees:
Judiciary, Member
Subcommittee on Civil Law and Procedure, Member

In the legislature
Kelly was first elected to the General Assembly in 1986, serving through 1994, and was re-elected in 1998. Kelly was defeated in the 2014 Maryland general election after serving 20 years in the Maryland House of Delegates.

Election

2014 general election 

Voters to choose one:
{| class="wikitable"
!Name
!Votes
!Percent
!Outcome
|-
|-
|Kevin Kelly, Dem.
|4,623
|40.9%
|Lost
|-
|-
|Jason C. Buckel, Rep.
|6,664
|58.9%
|Won
|}

2010 general election
Voters to choose one:
{| class="wikitable"
|-
!Name
!Votes
!Percent
!Outcome
|-
|-
|Kevin Kelly, Dem.
|6,226 
|   51.26%
|   Won
|-
|-
|Mary Beth Pirolozzi, Rep 
|5,908 
|   48.64%
|   Lost
|}

2006 general election
Voters to choose one:
{| class="wikitable"
|-
!Name
!Votes
!Percent
!Outcome
|-
|- 
|Kevin Kelly, Dem.
|6,489
|  55.7%
|   Won
|-
|-
|Mark A. Fisher, Rep.
|5,151
|  44.2%
|   Lost
|}

2002 general election 
Voters to choose one:
{| class="wikitable"
|-
!Name
!Votes
!Percent
!Outcome
|-
|- 
|Kevin Kelly, Dem.
|6,654
|  55.7%
|   Won
|-
|-
|Tricia Wolfe, Rep.
|5,286
|  44.3%
|   Lost
|-
|Other
|4
|  0.0%
|   Lost
|}

1998 general election 
Voters to choose one:
{| class="wikitable"
|-
!Name
!Votes
!Percent
!Outcome
|-
|- 
|Kevin Kelly, Dem.
|5,232
|  51%
|   Won
|-
|-
|Tricia Wolfe, Rep.
|4,991
|  49%
|   Lost
|}

1990 general election 
Voters to choose two:
{| class="wikitable"
|-
!Name
!Votes
!Percent
!Outcome
|-
|- 
|Kevin Kelly, Dem.
|11,579
|  41%
|   Won
|-
|- 
|Betty Workman, Dem.
|11,413
|  40%
|   Won
|-
|-
|Dolores Chase Morgan, Rep.
|5,321
|  19%
|   Lost
|}

1986 general election 
Voters to choose two:
{| class="wikitable"
|-
!Name
!Votes
!Percent
!Outcome
|-
|- 
|Betty Workman, Dem.
|8,195
|  29%
|   Won
|-
|- 
|Kevin Kelly, Dem.
|7,858
|  28%
|   Won
|-
|-
|Robert M. Hutcheson, Rep.
|6,151
|  22%
|   Lost
|-
|-
|William R. Davis, Rep.
|5,984
|  21%
|   Lost
|}

References

Notes

Democratic Party members of the Maryland House of Delegates
Living people
1953 births
Lawyers from Cumberland, Maryland
Frostburg State University alumni
University of Baltimore School of Law alumni
21st-century American politicians
Politicians from Cumberland, Maryland